Angela Portaluri (born March 5, 1937) is an Italian actress and model. As an actress, she appeared in I mostri (1963) and Il medico della mutua (1968). She was the 1956 Italian candidate to Miss World, although she had not won the Miss Italia contest, and took part into several fotoromanzi.

Filmography 
 Legend of the Lost (1957)
 Le avventure di Robi e Buck (1958)
 Nella città l'inferno (1959)
 La tigre di Eschnapur (1959)
 Il sepolcro indiano (1959)
Chi si ferma è perduto (1960)
 Il mio amico Jekyll (1960)
 La ragazza con la valigia (1961)
 Il commissario (1962)
 La bellezza di Ippolita (1962)
 I mostri (1963)
 Amore all'italiana (1966)
 Nato per uccidere (1967)
 Il medico della mutua (1968)
 Anche per Django le carogne hanno un prezzo (1971)
 Amico mio, frega tu... che frego io! (1973)

References

External links 
 

Italian actresses
1937 births
Living people
People from Maglie